Red Velvet is a 2008 American independent horror film directed by Bruce Dickson and written by Anthony Burns and Joe Moe. The film stars Henry Thomas and Kelli Garner and is the final film of Forrest J Ackerman.

Premise
A man meets a young woman, leading to a tale wherein a man in a white suit kills everyone at a birthday party.

Cast

Reception
Thomas M. Sipos of Hollywood Investigator wrote that it is a slasher film but not quite a horror film. And of the film's protagonist, wrote "He's psychotic, but he's also vulnerable, literate, and identifiable. He has more common with the suspense psychos of Psycho and Frenzy than with the superhuman psychos of Halloween and its progeny." Dread Central wrote that "Henry Thomas yet again proves to be one of those hidden gems", and that "Red Velvet is deranged and inspired in equal measures, sometimes both at the same time."

References

External links
 
 

2008 films
2008 horror films
American slasher films
American independent films
2000s English-language films
Films shot in Los Angeles
2000s slasher films
2008 independent films
2000s American films